David Elliot Hoberman (born September 19, 1952) is an American film and television producer, best known as the co-creator and executive producer of the USA Network television series Monk, and the founder and co-owner of Mandeville Films. He has produced over 40 films in his career, including the 2010 drama film The Fighter, for which he was nominated for the Academy Award for Best Picture.

Early life
Hoberman was born on September 19, 1952, the son of radio executive Ben Hoberman (1922–2014) and his wife Jacklyn (née Kanter; 1922–2013). Hoberman has an older brother, Thomas (Tom), an entertainment lawyer, and a younger sister, Joan (Joanie). He is from a Jewish family.

Career

Beginnings
Hoberman began his showbiz career with a mailroom job at the American Broadcasting Company, and later joined Norman Lear's Tandem Productions. In 1985, he joined the Walt Disney Studios as a film executive, and before that, he served as a talent agent at the International Creative Management. He was president of the Motion Picture Group at Disney, and was responsible for production of all feature films under Walt Disney, Touchstone, and Hollywood Pictures.

Mandeville Films
Hoberman founded Mandeville Films, an independent production company, in 1995. In 2002, along with business partner Todd Lieberman (a former Mandeville employee), Hoberman re-formed Mandeville Films and Television at Disney, after spending three years at Metro-Goldwyn-Mayer. Since 2002, Mandeville has produced a number of films with Disney, such as Bringing Down the House, Raising Helen, The Last Shot, The Shaggy Dog, Eight Below, Beverly Hills Chihuahua, and The Muppets.

He was the producer of Disney's live-action picture Honey, I Shrunk the Kids and the first ever stop-motion animated full-length feature, The Nightmare Before Christmas, which was produced by Tim Burton.

Monk
Hoberman, along with Andy Breckman, was the co-creator of the American comedy-drama detective mystery television series, Monk, and the protagonist of the series, Adrian Monk.

Monk was originally envisioned as a "more goofy and physical" Inspector Clouseau type of character. However, Hoberman came up with the idea of a detective with obsessive-compulsive disorder. This was inspired by his own bout with self-diagnosed obsessive-compulsive disorder; in a Pittsburgh Post-Gazette interview, he stated: "Like Monk, I couldn't walk on cracks and had to touch poles. I have no idea why – but if I didn't do these things, something terrible would happen."

Personal life
Hoberman was previously married to Tia Hoberman (née Yousse), with whom he has 3 children. He is a board member of the Starlight Starbright Children's Foundation and recently joined the Anxiety Disorder Association of America. He has been a visiting assistant professor with UCLA, and was a former board member of the Los Angeles Free Clinic. On October 4, 2011, David Hoberman was selected to be one of the Board of Trustees for Suffolk University in Boston, Massachusetts.

Filmography
He was a producer in all films unless otherwise noted.

Film

Production manager

As an actor

Miscellaneous crew

Television

As director

Awards and nominations

References

External links
 

Living people
1952 births
American film producers
American television producers
Film producers from California
USA Network executives
Suffolk University faculty
University of California, Los Angeles faculty
Disney executives
20th-century American Jews
21st-century American Jews
Primetime Emmy Award winners